The Hero Impulse is a motorcycle produced by Hero MotoCorp Ltd. Production was discontinued in 2016, sales were stopped in 2014 due to poor demand. Hero later released Hero XPulse 200 adventure motorcycle as a successor to this motorcycle.

References

Impulse
Motorcycles introduced in 2013